Maddalena Sirmen (9 December 1745 – 18 May 1818) was an Italian composer, violinist, and singer.

Biography 
Maddalena Laura Lombardini was born in Venice to poverty-stricken parents, noble by birth. She began her studies at the San Lazzaro dei Mendicanti (one of the four great hospices or Ospedali Grandi which trained orphaned girls in music) in Venice at the age of seven.

Hoping to play the violin professionally in a European classical scene almost entirely dominated by men, Lombardini was occasionally given permission to leave and study with the virtuoso violinist and composer Giuseppe Tartini (1692–1770). Tartini paid her tuition himself for musical lessons at the orphanage.

At age twenty-one, Lombardini received her maestro license at the orphanage, and was given permission to pursue a musical career outside of Venice. In 1767 she married the renowned violinist Ludovico Sirmen. The two began touring together that same year. Although little is documented about their relationship, it appears he encouraged Maddalena's career, respecting her compositions and relishing her successful solo career. Maddalena Lombardini soon established her reputation as one of the finest and most famous violinists and composers ever taught in a Venetian orphanage.

An early critical notice she received as an adult performer was from Quirino Gasparini, who wrote:
"She won the hearts of all the people of Turin with her playing . . . I wrote to old Tartini last Saturday telling him the good news. It will make him all the happier, since this student of his plays his violin compositions with such perfection that it is obvious she is his descendant".

Maddalena Lombardini was perhaps an even more successful composer. The newlyweds performed in Paris on 15 August 1768, performing a double violin concerto which they co-wrote.
"The 'Mercure de France' speaks in glowing terms of M. and Mme Sirmen's execution of a double violin concerto of their own composition."

In 1771, she debuted her "Concerto on the Violin" in London, met by rave reviews and lavish support. Her compositions displayed the violin in all its virtuosic brilliance in the dynamic yet restrained early Classical tradition.

Lombardini visited London for a final time in 1772, performing as a vocalist.  Although her career faded in its final years, she is remembered as a dynamic inventor and brilliant performer in 18th-century classical music.

Works 
"Six Trios à deux violons et violoncelle obligé"
"Six Quartettes à deux violons, alto, et basse"
"6 Duets for 2 violins, dedicated to the Duke of Gloucester"
"6 Concertos for violin with accompaniment for oboe, 2 horns & strings" (1771–1773)
"Six Sonates à deux violons"
"Six Concertos adapted for the Harpsichord by Signor Giordani"

Notes

References

Sources 
Blom, Eric ed.; Grove's Dictionary of Music and Musicians, 5th edition, New York: St. Martin's Press, 1954.
Bowers, Jane; Women Making Music. Indiana: University of Illinois Press, 1986.
Pendle, Karin; Women & Music: A History. Indiana: Indiana University Press, 1991.
Berdes, Jane L., ed. Maddalena Laura Lombardini Sirmen: Three Violin Concertos.  A-R Editions, 1991.

Further reading 
 
 Passadore, Francesco (2008). Catalogo tematico delle composizioni di Maddalena Lombardini Sirmen e Ludovico Sirmen, Edizioni de I Solisti Veneti, Padova. .

External links 

 
 

1745 births
1818 deaths
18th-century Italian composers
18th-century Italian women
18th-century women composers
19th-century classical composers
19th-century Italian composers
19th-century Italian women
19th-century women composers
Italian Classical-period composers
Italian classical violinists
Italian women classical composers
Pupils of Giuseppe Tartini
String quartet composers
Women classical violinists
Women music educators